Nina Pinzarrone (born 24 November 2006) is a Belgian figure skater. She placed fifth at the 2023 European Championships and eleventh at the 2022 World Junior Championships. She is the 2022 Latvia Trophy silver medalist and a two-time (2020, 2022) Belgian junior national champion.

Personal life 
Pinzarrone was born on 24 November 2006 in Brussels, Belgium. Her father Mario Pinzarrone is of Italian origin, while her mother, Laurence Novalet, is Belgian (Walloon). She has an older sister, Lily, who is also a figure skater. Nina's mother tongue is French but she skates in Flanders and goes to school in Dutch. Because her father is of Italian heritage, she studied the Italian language for a year as a fourth language but does not speak it.

Career

Early years 
Pinzarrone began learning how to skate in 2010 at the age of three. She followed her sister Lily, who became interested after watching figure skating on television.

2021–22 season: International junior debut 
Pinzarrone made her international junior and ISU Junior Grand Prix debuts in August at the 2022 JGP France II, the second of two JGP events hosted in Courchevel, France. She placed fifth in the short program and sixth in the free skate to place sixth overall. At her second JGP assignment, the 2022 JGP Slovenia, Pinzarrone replicated her short program and free skate placements from Courchevel but finished fifth in the overall standings.

Pinzarrone did not compete again until November when she handily won her second Belgian junior national title. Following her win, between December 2021 and February 2022, she claimed the junior women's titles at the Santa Claus Cup, the Icelab International Cup, and the Dragon Trophy. She finished seventh at the Challenge Cup in March.

In April, Pinzarrone competed at her first World Junior Championship. There, she was seventh in the short program but fell to sixteenth in the free skate after a series of mishaps, ultimately winding up in eleventh overall.

2022–23 season: International senior debut 
Pinzarrone was assigned to her first Grand Prix event, the 2022 MK John Wilson Trophy, in July. In August, she received a second assignment, replacing South Korean skater Lim Eun-soo at the 2022 Skate Canada International. She later withdrew from both events due to hip injury.

After recovery, Pinzarrone won the silver medal at the Latvia Trophy. Having acquired senior technical minimums, she was assigned to compete at the European Championships for the first time, alongside longtime Belgian national champion Loena Hendrickx. Her coach stated that her primary objectives for the event were to achieve the minimum scores to take Belgium's second berth at the World Championships later in the season. Pinzarrone underrotated the second part of her jump combination in the short program, but still finished sixth in the segment. She rose to fifth place after the free skate. She had the second-best technical score in the free skate.

Programs

Competitive highlights 
GP: Grand Prix; CS: Challenger Series; JGP: Junior Grand Prix.

References

External links 
 

2006 births
Living people
People from Brussels
Sportspeople from Brussels
Belgian female single skaters
Belgian children
21st-century Belgian women
Belgian people of Italian descent